Wyndham may refer to:

Wyndham (name), a surname and given name

Places

Australia
City of Wyndham, an LGA in Victoria
Shire of Wyndham-East Kimberley, a LGA in Western Australia
Wyndham Important Bird Area, Western Australia
Wyndham, New South Wales
Wyndham, Western Australia, a town in Western Australia

United Kingdom
Wyndham, Bridgend, a village in Wales
Wyndham Court, a block of social housing in Southampton, England
Wyndham House, Oxford, a retirement home in Oxford, England
Wyndham's Theatre, a West End theatre in London

United States
Wyndham, Virginia, a town
The Wyndham, an apartment building in Indianapolis, Indiana, on the National Register of Historic Places

Elsewhere
Wyndham, New Zealand, a town in Southland, South Island
Wyndham Street (once known as Pedder Hill) in Central, Hong Kong

Other
Travel + Leisure Co., formerly Wyndham Destinations, an American timeshare company
Wyndham Vacation Resorts Asia Pacific, a vacation ownership company and subsidiary of Wyndham Destinations
Wyndham Hotels & Resorts, an international hotel chain
Wyndham Championship, a PGA golf tournament in the United States
Wyndham College, a senior high school in Sydney, Australia
Wyndham School, the former name of West Lakes Academy in Egremont, Cumbria, England

See also
 Wyndham Hills, Pennsylvania, a suburb of York, Pennsylvania, US
 Windham (disambiguation)
 Wymondham, a town in Norfolk, England
 Wymondham, Leicestershire, a town in Leicestershire, England